The Daytime Emmy Award for Outstanding Guest Performer in a Drama Series is an award presented annually by the National Academy of Television Arts and Sciences (NATAS) and the Academy of Television Arts & Sciences (ATAS). It was first awarded at the 7th Daytime Emmy Awards in 1980, and is given to honor an actor/actress who has delivered an outstanding performance in a guest role while working within the daytime drama industry.

Originally referred to as the Outstanding Cameo Appearance in a Drama Series category, it was changed to Outstanding Guest Star in a Drama Series in 1987, when the category was re-introduced. It was re-introduced in 2015, when the category was called Outstanding Special Guest Performer in a Drama Series and marked its return after 28 years. It included a criterion that "the performer's character must have premiered in the current eligibility (calendar) year, and have made a limited number of appearances in a significant role". The category then began using its current title in 2018. The eligibility criteria also was modified, permitting actors who "are playing characters they either played before, or are newly cast" as able to submit in the category.

The Emmy was named after an "Immy", an affectionate term used to refer to the image orthicon camera tube. The statuette was designed by Louis McManus, who modeled the award after his wife, Dorothy. The Emmy statuette is fifteen inches tall from base to tip, weighing five pounds and is composed of iron, pewter, zinc and gold.

The award was first presented to Hugh McPhillips, for his role as Hugh Pearson on Days of Our Lives. Since its inception, the award has been given to twelve actors. The Bold and the Beautiful is the show with the most awarded actors, with a total of four. In 2015, Donna Mills, Fred Willard, and Ray Wise made Daytime Emmy Award history when they tied in the category.

As of the 2022 ceremony, Ted King is the most recent winner in this category for his role as Jack Finnegan on The Bold and the Beautiful.

Winners and nominees
Listed below are the winners of the award for each year, as well as the other nominees.

1980s

2010s

2020s

Series with most awards

Network with most awards

References

External links
 Daytime Emmy Awards at the IMDb

Daytime Emmy Awards